T. P. Peethambaran (born 19 February 1928) is an Indian politician and National Secretary of Nationalist Congress Party. He represented Palluruthy constituency in the Kerala Legislative Assembly  from 1980 to 1991.
 He was President of Nationalist Congress Party Kerala Unit.

Position Held
Chairman, Library Advisory Committee (1980–82). 
Vice President, Ernakulam District Congress (S) Committee; 
President, Ernakulam District Congress (S) Committee, All India Secondary Teachers Federation;  
General Secretary, K.P.C.C. (S), Nationalist Congress Party, PSTA; Member, Palluruthy Panchayath, All India Education Advisory Board; 
Coluncillor, Corporation of Cochin; 
Started political career through Cochin Rajya Praja Mandal; 
Joined ISP in 1948; 
State executive member of PSP till 1960; 
Joined INC in 1962.

References

1928 births
Living people
Indian politicians
Nationalist Congress Party politicians from Kerala
Indian National Congress (U) politicians
Indian National Congress politicians